The electoral district of Warrenheip and Grenville was an electorate of the Victorian Legislative Assembly in the Australian state of Victoria. Created in 1927 by the Electoral Districts Act 1926 after the abolition of the electoral district of Warrenheip, the electorate was abolished in 1945.

Members for Warrenheip and Grenville

Election results

References

Former electoral districts of Victoria (Australia)
1927 establishments in Australia
1945 disestablishments in Australia